The Church of Saint Anthony and Saint Clare is a Roman Catholic parish church in Montevideo, Uruguay.

Overview
This church is part of an important architectural ensemble which includes a convent; it is located on the intersection of the streets Canelones and Minas, in the barrio Palermo. The parish was established on 7 September 1961.

Held by the Friars Minor Capuchin, who have a long history in the territory of Uruguay since colonial times and now conform a Province with Argentina. The church is dedicated to Saint Anthony of Padua and Saint Clare of Assisi.

It boasts a Tamburini organ from 1924, one of the biggest in the country.

Same devotion
There are other churches in Uruguay dedicated to Saint Anthony of Padua:
 St. Anthony of Padua Church in Pueblo Nuevo, near Las Piedras
 St. Anthony of Padua Parish Church in San Antonio
 St. Anthony of Padua Parish Church in Sarandí del Yí
 Parish Church of St. Anthony of Padua and Our Lady of the Valley in Aiguá

References

External links

Palermo, Montevideo
1961 establishments in Uruguay

Roman Catholic church buildings in Montevideo
Franciscan churches in Uruguay
20th-century Roman Catholic church buildings in Uruguay